is a Japanese Nippon Professional Baseball pitcher for the Chiba Lotte Marines in Japan's Central League.

Early baseball career
A native of Ibaraki, Ishizaki started playing baseball in grade school and continued all the way until he entered Sanwa High School. His school made it to the 3rd round of the prefectural tournament, but failed to make it to Koshien. During that time, his fastballs already sparked the interest of some scouts as it reached the 145 km/h levels, but in the end, none of the 12 NPB teams drafted him when he graduated high school.

Wanting to pursue a career in baseball, he joined the industrial leagues under Shin Nittetsu Sumikin Kashima. However, he began experiencing lower back pains shortly after he joined the team. Apparently, this was brought about by the strain that resulted from his overhead pitching form, and as a solution, he decided to alter his delivery form to a lower arm angle. With a stroke of luck, the altered form worked to his advantage, bringing his pitches to a maximum of 151 km/h, making him indispensable to the team.

Professional career

Hanshin Tigers
In October 2014, he was chosen as the Hanshin Tigers 2nd pick in the 2014 Nippon Professional Baseball draft. He signed with the Tigers on November 17 for an estimated 12 million yen annual salary, and a 70 million yen signing bonus. He was assigned the jersey number 30.

His teammate from Shin Nittetsu, Yuya Yokoyama was the Tiger's first pick during the same draft, making them the first players from the same team to be drafted as the 1st and 2nd picks in franchise history, and the first pitchers from the same team to be drafted as such in NPB history.

2015

He debuted as a reliever during the March 29 opening card with the Dragons in Kyocera Dome, where he retired 3 consecutive batters in the 8th inning, helping the Tigers sweep their opponent in their first 3 games for the season.

Chiba Lotte Marines
On July 4, 2019, Ishizaki was traded to the Chiba Lotte Marines in exchange for Keisuke Takano.

Playing Style
With a three-quarter right-handed side throw, his fastballs register up to 151 km/h on the radar gun. And while he can deliver a slider and occasional change-up, he relied mostly on his fastballs during his career in the industrial leagues.

References

External links

Living people
1990 births
Baseball people from Ibaraki Prefecture
Japanese baseball players
Nippon Professional Baseball pitchers
Hanshin Tigers players